The Carolinas Open is a golf tournament played in the Carolinas, open to both amateur and professional golfers. It is run by the Carolinas section of the PGA of America. It has been played annually since 1923 at a variety of courses around both states.

Winners

2022 Grady Newton (a)
2021 Tommy Gibson
2020 Kelly Mitchum
2019 Rick Morton
2018 Jerry Haas
2017 Josh Nichols (a)
2016 Drew Younts
2015 Jerry Haas
2014 Steve Larick
2013 Ray Franz
2012 Aaron Black
2011 Jack Fields (a)
2010 Ivan Schronce
2009 Kelly Mitchum
2008 Scott Medlin
2007 Scott Medlin
2006 Kelly Mitchum
2005 Scott Medlin
2004 Tim Straub
2003 Jeff Lankford
2002 Steve Isley
2001 Gus Ulrich
2000 Karl Kimball
1999 Bob Boyd
1998 Jeff Lankford
1997 David Thore
1996 Bryan Sullivan
1995 David Thore
1994 Chris Tucker
1993 Bob Boyd
1992 Vic Lipscomb
1991 Richard Kincaid
1990 Chris Tucker
1989 Bob Boyd
1988 Mike Kallam
1987 Mike Kallam
1986 Rodney Morrow
1985 Neal Lancaster
1984 Tim Collins
1983 Billy Poteat (a)
1982 Bob Boyd
1981 Jim Westbrook
1980 Jack Lewis Jr.
1979 Ronnie Smoak
1978 Mike Carn
1977 Randy Glover
1976 Russell Glover
1975 Leonard Thompson
1974 Vance Heafner (a)
1973 David Robinson
1972 Gene Thompson
1971 Hamp Auld
1970 Norman Flynn
1969 Brad Anderson
1968 Joe Inman (a)
1967 Randy Glover
1966 Sonny Ridenhour
1965 Sonny Ridenhour
1964 Davis Love Jr.
1963 Harold Kneece
1962 Charlie Smith (a)
1961 Ronny Thomas
1960 Al Smith
1959 P.J. Boatwright (a)
1958 Furman Hayes
1957 P.J. Boatwright (a)
1956 Billy Capps
1955 Charles Farlow
1954 Dow Finsterwald
1953 Clayton Heafner
1952 Bobby Locke and Billy Joe Patton (a) (tie)
1951 Billy Joe Patton (a)
1950 Johnny Palmer
1949 Johnny Palmer
1948 Bobby Locke
1947 Bobby Locke
1946 Skip Alexander
1945 Orville White
1944 Purvis Ferree
1942–1943 No tournament due to World War II
1941 Johnny Palmer
1940 Dave Tinsley
1939 Clayton Heafner
1938 Orville White
1937 Tony Manero
1936 Harold Long
1935 Fred McCanless
1934 Tony Manero
1933 Henry Picard
1932 Henry Picard
1931 Marshall Crichton
1930 Marshall Crichton
1929 Tully Blair (a)
1928 Marshall Crichton
1927 Bill Goebel
1926 Henry Picard
1925 Henry Picard
1924 Charles Reynolds
1923 Harold Woodman

(a) denotes amateur

External links
PGA of America - Carolinas section
List of winners

Golf in North Carolina
Golf in South Carolina
PGA of America sectional tournaments